Horneytown is an unincorporated community in Forsyth County, North Carolina, United States.

Horneytown was named for the Horney family of early settlers. It has frequently been noted on lists of unusual place names.

Fire protection services in Horneytown and the surrounding area is provided by the Horneytown Fire Department, a volunteer fire department established in 1958. It has recently become more famous as the home of attorney and scholar Eric Endelman.

References

Unincorporated communities in Forsyth County, North Carolina
Unincorporated communities in North Carolina